Frederick Cooke (born 27 August 1980) is a stand-up comedian and actor from Kells, County Meath, Ireland.

Career
In 2011, Cooke began touring regularly with his stand-up playing the Irish comedy circuit including the Cat Laughs Comedy Festival. That same year he made his debut at Edinburgh Fringe Festival with his show, 'Comfort in Chaos' for which Chortle named him "Ireland's Most Unique Stand-Up."

Between 2009 and 2016, Cooke appeared in various sketches on the RTÉ comedy show, Republic of Telly.

In 2012, Cooke played various roles in David McSavage's comedy sketch show The Savage Eye. He also had a guest role in the BBC comedy series, Vexed.

Throughout 2014 and 2015, Cooke was one of the lead pranksters on RTÉ's hidden camera show, The Fear.

In 2015, Cooke wrote and starred in his own comedic documentary, Operation Transportation: Highway to Kells for RTÉ2 which followed him learning to drive at the age of 35.

As of 2017, Cooke has been the announcer on his friend Tommy Tiernan's chat show, The Tommy Tiernan Show. Thats same year he had a guest role in the RTÉ comedy series, Bridget & Eamon.

He appeared on the 2019 series of the Irish edition of Dancing with the Stars.

Filmography

Television

References

External links

Irish male comedians
Irish stand-up comedians
People from County Meath
1981 births
Living people